Asia Aluminum is the largest aluminum extrusion group in Asia, with an annual designed capacity of 350,000 metric tons.  It employed, directly and indirectly, in excess of 10,000 people, predominantly in the Asia Aluminum Industrial City which housed its primary manufacturing facilities, located in the Zhaoqing region of the People's Republic of China.  Asia Aluminum made its debut on the Hong Kong Stock Exchange in 1998.

Recent Events and Decline

In 2004, the Company issued Senior Notes which were listed on the Singapore Exchange, with a total principal amount of US$450,000,000. The Senior Notes were issued primarily to fund the construction of the Asia Aluminum Industrial City.

In 2006, with Merrill Lynch as financial advisers, the management of Asia Aluminum performed a leveraged buyout of the outstanding issued share capital in Asia Aluminum, financed by the issuance of US$535,000,000 in payment-in-kind notes (PIK notes), which were listed on the Singapore Exchange. After acquiring all outstanding shares, Asia Aluminum was delisted from the Hong Kong Stock Exchange.

The global economic downturn in 2008 and 2009 had a significant negative impact on the aluminium industry, including Asia Aluminum. Furthermore, Asia Aluminum incurred a considerable drain on its cash resources due to the construction of its flat rolled products facility.

At the end of 2008, the company reported its total assets to be US$2.4 billion with US$1.5 billion in liabilities. On 13 February 2009, Asia Aluminum management launched a tender offer to buy back the Senior Notes and PIK Notes at 27.5% and 13.5% of face value respectively.  The offer was withdrawn after it failed to draw sufficient support from the respective noteholders.

As the company's financial condition deteriorated, it became the subject of PRC legal actions commenced by onshore creditors, which threatened its PRC assets.  Demand letters were also issued against various Asia Aluminum Group entities by Hong Kong-based lenders. The demand letters triggered the cross default of the Senior Notes and the PIK Notes, causing in excess of US$985,000,000 of debt to become immediately due and payable.  Asia Aluminum did not have sufficient funds to repay these debts.  Consequently, as at 28 February 2009, Asia Aluminum was deemed insolvent both on a cash flow and a balance sheet basis.  At the time, Asia Aluminum's total onshore and offshore debt was in the order of US$1,544,000,000.

In March 2009, the company began liquidation proceedings in Hong Kong after management withdrew its tender offer for the Senior and PIK Notes. In the same month, the Hong Kong Court appointed FTI Consulting as provisional liquidator. When attempting to gain control of the company's mainland China subsidiaries, employees of FTI Consulting reported that both management and staff had been uncooperative.

Asia Aluminum's PRC assets had become under increasing threat of value deterioration due to the legal demands that had been commenced, which, if pursued, would have likely resulted in the auctioning off of the assets by the PRC Courts.  Proceeds from the auction would have likely been distributed to onshore creditors first, and the likelihood of any return to offshore creditors from the PRC assets would have been significantly reduced if a return was achievable at all.

In view of this threat, FTI Consulting negotiated a non-exclusive agreement with limited terms to sell 100% equity in Asia Aluminum's PRC operating assets to a management buyout consortium.  This structure allowed for the potential advent of a superior offer from another party and the ability of the Provisional Liquidators to secure information from management, which had not been forthcoming, on the onshore assets.  This was considered the only way to avoid a PRC bankruptcy and ensure some level of returns to offshore creditors.

Despite significant media coverage of the sale, no other firm bids were tendered for Asia Aluminum's PRC assets.  Norsk Hydro submitted an indicative bid for the company, but its bid was left to expire after it emerged that local authorities may oppose its bid and support a "restructuring proposal submitted by the management."

Furthermore, the local authorities favoured a management buyout, as the authorities considered this the only option that would allow for social stability to be maintained in the region.  The local government had negotiated a stay of local creditors and convinced local banks to allow Asia Aluminum to continue to draw on its working capital facilities.  This allowed for operations to continue whilst a restructuring option could be negotiated.  Therefore, any successful bidder needed to have the support of the local government and of local stakeholders.  No interested parties proved to have this level of support.

In June 2009, the Hong Kong Court approved for the management team to purchase Asia Aluminum for US$475,000,000, generating returns of 18 cents on the dollar to Senior Noteholders and less than one cent on the dollar to PIK Noteholders.  Obligations to Hong Kong lenders and onshore creditors were fully assumed by the management buyout consortium.  As is characteristic of bankruptcy situations in China, a majority of Asia Aluminum's investors were unable to fully recoup their investments, and its management team now owns the US$2.4 billion business.

Asia Aluminum is one of many bankruptcy failures of Chinese companies formerly listed on the Hong Kong Stock Exchange.

References

Aluminium companies of China
Metal companies of Hong Kong
Hong Kong brands
Companies formerly listed on the Hong Kong Stock Exchange
Companies that have filed for bankruptcy in the People's Republic of China
1992 establishments in China